Ruppert Stadium was a baseball stadium in Newark, New Jersey, in the area now known as the Ironbound. Originally named Davids' Stadium after Charles L. Davids, owner of the Newark Bears, it was home to the minor league Newark Bears of the International League from 1926 to 1949, and to the Negro leagues Newark Stars in 1926 and Newark Eagles from 1936 to 1948. It was also the home field of the short-lived Newark Bears of the first American Football League in 1926. The stadium was named for Jacob Ruppert, a baseball team owner who built the farm system of the New York Yankees.

In October 1952, the Yankees organization announced their intention to tear down the 14,000-seat stadium and sell the land for real estate development. The local Board of Education stepped in to purchase the stadium for $275,000 and converted the property into a school recreation center. In 1967 the stadium was demolished and the land was sold again the following year to the Vita Food Products company, which built a food plant on the site.

See also
 History of sports in Newark, New Jersey
 Hinchliffe Stadium

External links
Sanborn map showing part of the ballpark, 1929

References

Defunct baseball venues in the United States
Defunct minor league baseball venues
Event venues established in 1926
1967 disestablishments in New Jersey
American Football League (1926) venues
Negro league baseball venues
Baseball venues in New Jersey
Sports venues in Newark, New Jersey
Demolished sports venues in New Jersey
1926 establishments in New Jersey
Defunct sports venues in New Jersey